A gift is a present. 

Gift may also refer to:

Books
 Gift (Kielland novel), an 1883 novel by Alexander Kielland
 Gifts (novel), one of the novels in the Annals of the Western Shore series by Ursula K. Le Guin
 Gift (visual novel), a 2006 Japanese visual novel and anime series

Computing
 giFT, a file-sharing computer program
 GIFT (file format), the file format for storing multi-choice, short answer, matching and other questions
 Gift (video game), 3D platform game by Eko System

Film and visual arts
 Gift (1966 film), a 1966 Danish film
 Gift (1993 film), a 1993 film by Perry Farrell and Casey Niccoli
 A Gift (film), a 2016 Thai film
 Gift (TV series), a Japanese drama television series
 ".hack//Gift", an anime original video animation in the .hack series

Music

Albums
 Gift (Curve album)
 Gift (The Sisterhood album)
 Gift (Taproot album), 2000
 A Gift (album), an album by Canadian country singer Paul Brandt
 Gift (The Autumns EP), 2003
 Gift (Kanjani Eight EP), 2009

Songs 
 "Gift" (song), a 1997 song by Maaya Sakamoto
 "Gifts" (song), a 2008 R&B song by Ray J from his album All I Feel

Acronyms
 Gamete intrafallopian transfer, infertility treatment
 Global Internet Freedom Task Force of the US Government
 Graduate Institute of Ferrous Technology, Pohang University of Science and Technology
 Greater Internet Fuckwad Theory, an unofficial name for the online disinhibition effect
 Gujarat International Finance Tec-City, India (proposed)
 United Nations Global Initiative to Fight Human Trafficking
 The Global Institute for Tomorrow, Hong Kong

People
 Jassie Gift, South Indian singer and music composer
 Roland Gift (born 1961), British singer and actor
 Wayne Gift (1915–1998), American football player
 Gift Ngoepe (born 1990), South African baseball player

Other uses
 Diplomatic gift
 Gift (law), the legal aspects of property
 Gift economy, an economic system in which participants give away things of value to the shared benefit of the community
 Gift (2023 ice show), produced by Japanese figure skater Yuzuru Hanyu

See also
Gifted (disambiguation)
 Gift of Gab (disambiguation)
 The Gift (disambiguation)
 Present (disambiguation)